Grahamville is an unincorporated community in McCracken County, in the U.S. state of Kentucky.

History
Grahamville was platted in 1877 by Zelotes Cllinton Graham, who gave the community his last name. A post office called Grahamville was established in 1888, and remained in operation until 1909. A variant name was "Grahamsville".

References

Unincorporated communities in McCracken County, Kentucky
Unincorporated communities in Kentucky